Naldaviricetes is a class of viruses, which infect arthropods. Members of Naldaviricetes are characterized by large enveloped rod-shaped virions, circular double-stranded DNA genomes, and replication in the nucleus of the host cell. All of them (including the unassigned Polydnaviridae family) share a set of unique genes not found in other viruses, which include the presence of multiple interspersed direct repeats, various subunits of DNA polymerase and RNA polymerase, four late expression factor genes, and infectivity factor genes suggesting a common host entry mechanism.

Phylogenetics 

These viruses encompass several genes that are distantly related to core genes of the Nucleocytoviricota and thus could be highly derived members of the DJR-MCP viruses (kingdom Bamfordvirae of the realm Varidnaviria), despite the absence of the DJR-MCP and formation of odd-shaped virions. Preliminary phylogenetic analysis of several essential genes that are shared by all these arthoropod viruses and the Nucleocytoviricota, such as PolB, RNAP subunits, helicase-primase and thiol oxidoreductase, has suggested that this group of viruses might be a highly derived offshoot of the Nucleocytoviricota.

Classification
Naldaviricetes contains one order and a family unassigned to an order. This taxonomy is shown hereafter:

 Class: Naldaviricetes
 Order: Lefavirales
 Unassigned family: Nimaviridae

The unassigned family Polydnaviridae is a potential member of the group because they share the characteristic genes of Naldaviricetes and appear to have evolved from nudiviruses of the order Lefavirales.

References

Viruses
Virus classes